Kim Myong-nam (born 8 February 1969) is a North Korean male weightlifter, competing in the 70 kg category and representing North Korea at international competitions. He won the bronze medal at the 1992 Summer Olympics in the 75 kg event and the silver medal at the 1996 Summer Olympics in the 70 kg event. He competed at world championships, most recently at the 1997 World Weightlifting Championships.

Kim set three world records – one in the snatch, one in the clean & jerk, and one in the total.

Major results
 - 1989 World Championships Lightweight class (327.5 kg)
 - 1990 World Championships Lightweight class (342.5 kg)
 - 1991 World Championships Lightweight class (340.0 kg)
 - 1993 World Championships Middleweight class (362.5 kg)
 - 1990 Asian Games Middleweight class

References

External links

1969 births
Living people
North Korean male weightlifters
Weightlifters at the 1992 Summer Olympics
Weightlifters at the 1996 Summer Olympics
Olympic weightlifters of North Korea
Place of birth missing (living people)
Olympic medalists in weightlifting
Olympic silver medalists for North Korea
Olympic bronze medalists for North Korea
Weightlifters at the 1990 Asian Games
Medalists at the 1990 Asian Games
Asian Games gold medalists for North Korea
Asian Games medalists in weightlifting
Medalists at the 1992 Summer Olympics
Medalists at the 1996 Summer Olympics
20th-century North Korean people
21st-century North Korean people